The 2008 NBA Development League Draft was the seventh NBA Development League draft. It was held on November 7, 2008 at 7:00pm Eastern Time. The Tulsa 66ers selected the 6'9" forward Chris Richard with the first overall pick.

First round

Second round

Third round

Fourth round

Fifth round

Sixth round

Seventh round

Eighth round

Ninth round

Tenth round

References

NBA G League draft
draft
NBA Development League draft
NBA Development League draft
NBA Development League draft
Basketball in Atlanta
Events in Atlanta